Włodzimierz Sadalski (born 29 August 1949) is a Polish former volleyball player and coach, a member of the Poland national team from 1970 to 1977. During his career, he won the titles of the 1976 Olympic Champion and the 1974 World Champion.

Honours

As a player
 CEV European Champions Cup
  1977/1978 – with Płomień Milowice
 National championships
 1976/1977  Polish Championship, with Płomień Milowice
 1978/1979  Polish Championship, with Płomień Milowice

External links

 
 
 Player profile at Volleybox.net

1949 births
Living people
Sportspeople from Poznań
Polish men's volleyball players
Polish volleyball coaches
Olympic volleyball players of Poland
Volleyball players at the 1976 Summer Olympics
Olympic medalists in volleyball
Olympic gold medalists for Poland
Medalists at the 1976 Summer Olympics
Polish expatriate sportspeople in Finland
Expatriate volleyball players in Finland